The Kanpur Electricity Supply Company Ltd. (KESCo), formerly known as Kanpur Electricity Supply Authority, is an electrical power company in Kanpur, India. A Government of Uttar Pradesh undertaking, part of Uttar Pradesh Power Corporation Limited, it was formed on 14 January 2000, and supplies power to the entire area under the Kanpur Municipal Corporation.

KESCo is responsible for distribution and bulk supply of power in Kanpur and provides power to over 427,158 consumers, consisting of approximately 350,000 domestic, 73 thousand commercial, eight thousand others including small, medium, large, and heavy power connections. Maintaining all the consumers through a network based on 61 electrical substations of 33/6.6 kV level, 333 feeders of 11 kV level and more than 3000 distribution transformers of different levels. Currently Saumya Aggarwal is the Managing Director at KESCo.

References

External links 
 Official website

Electric power distribution network operators in India
Companies based in Kanpur
Energy companies established in 2000
2000 establishments in Uttar Pradesh
Government-owned energy companies of Uttar Pradesh